Oxford Classical Texts (OCT), or Scriptorum Classicorum Bibliotheca Oxoniensis, is a series of books published by Oxford University Press. It contains texts of ancient Greek and Latin literature, such as Homer's Odyssey and Virgil's Aeneid, in the original language with a critical apparatus. Works of science and mathematics, such as Euclid's Elements, are generally not represented. Since the books are meant primarily for serious students of the classics, the prefaces and notes have traditionally been in Latin (so that the books are written in the classical languages from the title page to the index), and no translations or explanatory notes are included. Several recent volumes, beginning with Lloyd-Jones and Wilson's 1990 edition of Sophocles, have broken with tradition and feature introductions written in English (though the critical apparatus is still in Latin).

In format, Oxford Classical Texts have always been published in British Crown octavo (7½ by 5¼ inches). Initially they were produced in three formats: Cloth, the standard style, bound in dark blue or black cloth bindings; Interleaved, for scholars and students, where each pair of printed leaves had a blank leaf bound between them for the scholar's notes, also bound in dark blue or black cloth; and India paper, for travellers and readers, printed on strong, thin India paper and bound in dark red cloth bindings. However, by the 1950s, only standard cloth editions were in general issue, though some interleaved copies were still produced into the 1960s.

Oxoniensis is an abbreviation used to denote mainly a single volume of the series (fully: editio Oxoniensis), rarely the whole collection; correspondingly, Teubneriana is used with reference to the Bibliotheca Scriptorum Graecorum et Romanorum Teubneriana, a series with the same aim as the OCT.  Those who want some help in reading the classics may prefer the Loeb Classical Library, which includes English translations, or the Collection Budé, which includes French translations.

See also
 Bibliotheca Teubneriana
 Collection Budé
 Loeb Classical Library
 Scrittori greci e latini
 Oxford Medieval Texts

References

External links
Oxford Classical Texts at OUP
  Includes a list of Oxford Classical Texts published up to 1939

Series of books
Classical Texts
Classics publications